Alena Smith is an American screenwriter, producer, and author best known for creating the Apple TV+ series Dickinson. In addition to creating the show, she also executive produces and has written numerous episodes.

Career 
Smith got her first professional writing gig for the television series My America, before eventually becoming a staff writer for The Newsroom. In 2019, she created, produced, and wrote the Apple TV+ series Dickinson, with a second season premiering in January 2021 and a third in November 2021.

Filmography

Film

Television

Bibliography 

 Tween Hobo (2016)

References

External links 

 

Living people
American television writers
American screenwriters
American television producers
American women television producers
American women screenwriters
American women television writers
21st-century American women writers
Year of birth missing (living people)